The Åland Progress Group was a political party in the Åland Islands that contested elections in 1999 and 2003.

History
The party split from Freeminded Co-operation during the 1995–1999 parliamentary term. In the elections of 2003, the party received 3.4% of popular vote and one of the 30 seats. In 2007 it didn't run as its sole representative Ronald Boman retired.

External links

Defunct political parties in Åland